The terms life review and flashback before death refer to a phenomenon widely reported as occurring during near-death experiences, in which a person rapidly sees much or the totality of their life history. Life review is often described by people claiming to have experienced this phenomenon as "having their life flash before their eyes".

The phenomenon also refers to a widely-used trope in fiction, film, and television where a recap montage of a character's life is shown in a sequence before that character's death.

Research and phenomenology

Commentators note that near-death experiencers undergo a life review in which the meaning of their life is presented to them, but also how their life affected other people, as well as an awareness of the thoughts and feelings of these people. Bruce Greyson  described the life review as a "rapid revival of memories that sometimes extends over the person’s entire life". The memories are described as being "many". The review might also include a panoramic quality. According to Jeffrey Long the experience of a life review is often described from a third-person perspective.

In fiction
Life review, or My Life Flashed Before My Eyes, also refers to a widely-used trope in fiction, film, and television where a recap montage of a character's life is shown in a sequence before that character's death.

In films
 In Armageddon when Harry detonates the bomb, images of his daughter and wife briefly flash on the screen.
 In Vanilla Sky, David experiences this when jumping off a building.
 In Train to Busan, after being infected with the zombie virus, Seok-woo has a flashback of himself holding his daughter as a baby and he smiles then jumps off the train seconds before fully transforming into the undead.
 In American Beauty, after Lester Burnham is shot, he narrates through a series of important life events.
 In Puss In Boots: The Last Wish, when Puss encounters Death, his previous lives flash in front of his eyes.
 In Defending Your Life, in an afterlife way-station resembling a major city, the lives of the recently deceased are examined in a court-like setting.

In TV
 In "The 12 Days of Christine", an episode of Inside No. 9, it is revealed that the entire plot is Christine's life events replaying as she dies of a car accident.
 In the season finale of Stranger Things (season 4), Max's memories from the previous seasons replay during a near death experience.

See also
 Aerial toll-houses
 Clinical death
 Out-of-body experiences
 Effects of adrenaline on human memory
 Terminal lucidity

References

Near-death experiences
New Age
Pseudoscience